Edwin Charles Ernest Lowe  (1 November 19201 May 2011) was an English snooker commentator for the BBC and ITV. His husky, hushed tones earned him the nickname "Whispering Ted".

Life and career
Born in Lambourn, Berkshire, Lowe was general manager of London's Leicester Square Hall, the home of professional billiards and snooker. He got his break one day when the BBC's regular commentator, Raymond Glendenning, was suffering from laryngitis. Because there was no commentary box, Lowe spoke in a whisper, which became his trademark.

Lowe became the commentator for the snooker television show Pot Black from 1969 and went on to become the "voice of snooker" and led the commentary in many tournaments. He also commentated in what is generally regarded as snooker's greatest final, that between Steve Davis and Dennis Taylor in the 1985 World Snooker Championship.

Lowe uttered the occasional on-air gaffe, one of his most famous quotes being, "and for those of you who are watching in black and white, the pink is next to the green." He once told viewers that Fred Davis, struggling to rest one leg on the edge of the table in order to reach a long shot, "is getting on a bit and is having trouble getting his leg over".

Lowe retired after the 1996 World Snooker Championship final, although he briefly joined in the commentary for the 2005 World Championship final between Matthew Stevens and Shaun Murphy, which Murphy won.

Lowe died, aged 90, in Bexhill-on-Sea, on the morning of the first session of the 2011 World Snooker Championship final. He was survived by his wife Jean, daughter Margaret and son Michael.

Recalling Lowe after his death, seven-time world champion Stephen Hendry, who was once described by Lowe as the "wonder bairn of Scotland", said: "I remember playing Junior Pot Black, I was only 12 and he was a complete gentleman. Me and my father were down there and he was so nice to us."

References

External links

Obituary in The Independent

1920 births
2011 deaths
BBC sports presenters and reporters
British sports broadcasters
Members of the Order of the British Empire
People from Lambourn
Snooker writers and broadcasters